Lindenbaum is a surname, meaning Tilia in German; the nearest British tree name is Lime tree. It may refer to:

Belda Lindenbaum, Jewish philanthropist and feminist
Adolf Lindenbaum, Polish mathematician 
Lindenbaum's lemma
Lindenbaum–Tarski algebra
John Lindenbaum, musician
Der Lindenbaum - one of the most well-known of Schubert's songs, from the song-cycle Winterreise.
Alfred Lindon, born Alfred Lindenbaum (c.1868 - 1948), businessman and art collector
Shirley Lindenbaum, Australian anthropologist

See also
 Midreshet Lindenbaum, an institution of higher Torah learning for women in Israel

German-language surnames
Jewish surnames